炸醬麵 may refer to:
Jajangmyeon, a Korean noodle dish
Zhajiangmian, a Chinese noodle dish